Calophyllum acutiputamen is a species of flowering plant in the Calophyllaceae family. It is found only in Papua New Guinea. It is threatened by habitat loss.

References

acutiputamen
Flora of Papua New Guinea
Critically endangered plants
Taxonomy articles created by Polbot